Killenaule GAA is a Gaelic Athletic Association club is located in south County Tipperary, Ireland. The club participates in hurling and Gaelic football competitions organized by Tipperary GAA. The club is a member of the South Tipperary divisional board.

Honours

 Tipperary Senior Hurling Championship Runners-Up 1932, 1942
 South Tipperary Senior Hurling Championship Winners: 1916, 1918, 1931, 1932, 1940 (Killenaule CYMS), 1941, 1942, 1943, 1953, 1954, 1955, 1961, 1963, 1988, 1989, 1991, 2005, 2007, 2008, 2013, 2015
 South Tipperary Senior Football Championship Winners (2): 2012, 2014
 Tipperary Intermediate Football Championship Winners (1): 2004
 South Tipperary Intermediate Football Championship Winner (1): 2004
 South Tipperary Intermediate Hurling Championship Winners (6): 1968, 1974, 1978, 1983, 1985, 1986
 Tipperary Junior A Football Championship Winners (1): 1994
 South Tipperary Junior A Football Championship Winners (2): 1982, 1994
 South Tipperary Junior B Football Championship Winners (1): 1997
 Tipperary Junior A Hurling Championship Winners (2): 1927, 1951
 South Tipperary Junior A Hurling Championship Winners (7): 1915, 1927, 1931, 1937, 1938, 1951, 1973
 All Ireland Junior B Hurling Championship  Runners up (1): 2015
 Munster Junior B Hurling Championship Winners (1) : 2015
 Tipperary Junior B Hurling Championship Winners (1): 2014
 South Tipperary Junior B Hurling Championship Winners (3): 1997, 2013, 2014
 South Tipperary Under-21 A Football Championship Winners (2): 1978 (with Mullinahone as Young Irelands), 2003
 South Tipperary Minor Football Championship Winners (2): 1977 (with Mullinahone as Young Irelands), 2006
 Tipperary Minor B Football Championship Winners: (1) 2009
 South Tipperary Minor B Football Championship Winners (2): 1995, 2009
 South Tipperary Minor Hurling Championship Winners (10): 1955, 1958, 1965, 1989, 1990, 1993, 1999, 2001, 2001, 2002

Notable players

 Kieran Bergin
 Gerry Kennedy
 Pat Kerwick
 Donie O'Connell
 Joe O'Dwyer
 John O'Dwyer
 Paul Shelly
 Damien McCormack (formerly St Patrick’s) 
 Declan Fanning

References

External links
Tipperary GAA site
Club website

Gaelic games clubs in County Tipperary
Hurling clubs in County Tipperary
1885 establishments in Ireland